The 2010 Daventry District Council election took place on 6 May 2010 to elect members of Daventry District Council in England. This was on the same day as other local elections.

Election result

Ward results

References

2010 English local elections
2010
2010s in Northamptonshire